Parlier High School (PHS) is a public high school in Parlier, California, United States.

Parlier High School serves grades 9-12 in the Parlier Unified School District. Based on its state test results, it has received a GreatSchools Rating of 4 out of 10.

This school has an average Parent Rating of 4 out of 5 stars, based on reviews from 18 parents.

Demographics
During the 2006-2007  school year, 894 students were enrolled at Parlier High School, of which 8% were students with disabilities, 42.6% were English Learners, and 99% were socioeconomically disadvantaged.  The student population is 97.9% Hispanic or Latino.

Athletics
The school's mascot is the Mighty Panther. The school's colors are Blue & Gold. Parlier High School participates in sports as a Div. IV school in the CIF Central Section and play in the West Sequoia League (WSL). The sports at PHS include:

Academics

During the 2006-2007 school year, 894 students were enrolled at the school.
-	
Parlier Academics include:
 		 	
California A-G requirements
Advanced Placement

School Publications

The school publications are:
 		 	
The Arrow (School Yearbook)

References

External links
 phs.parlierunified.org Parlier High School Panthers
 www.parlierunified.com Parlier USD

High schools in Fresno County, California
Public high schools in California

de:Parlier
nl:Parlier (Californië)
vo:Parlier